The Alabama Council for Technology in Education (ACTE) was founded in the early 1980s, to promote general education and knowledge of technology for Alabama students in grades 3–12, in many areas ranging from computer literacy to video production.

Background
The ACTE comprises eight regions throughout Alabama: North East, North West, North Central, East Central, West Central, Central, South East and South West.  These regions hold annual Regional Technology fairs whereby the winners go to the State Fair in Montgomery to compete in fourteen competition categories.

The largest of the regional fairs is the jointly-held South East and South West Regional fair that is held at the Faulkner State College campus in Bay Minette, Alabama.

Over 200 schools throughout Alabama are part of the ACTE.
Educational organizations based in Alabama
Organizations established in the 1980s
1980s establishments in Alabama